Fuller Acres (formerly, Hilltop) is a census-designated place in Kern County, California. The population was 991 at the 2010 census.

Demographics

At the 2010 census Fuller Acres had a population of 991. The racial makeup of Fuller Acres was 607 (61.3%) White, 13 (1.3%) African American, 12 (1.2%) Native American, 1 (0.1%) Asian, 0 (0.0%) Pacific Islander, 329 (33.2%) from other races, and 29 (2.9%) from two or more races. Hispanic or Latino of any race were 768 people (77.5%).

The whole population lived in households, no one lived in non-institutionalized group quarters and no one was institutionalized.

There were 244 households, 138 (56.6%) had children under the age of 18 living in them, 137 (56.1%) were opposite-sex married couples living together, 30 (12.3%) had a female householder with no husband present, 30 (12.3%) had a male householder with no wife present.  There were 30 (12.3%) unmarried opposite-sex partnerships, and 1 (0.4%) same-sex married couples or partnerships. 35 households (14.3%) were one person and 7 (2.9%) had someone living alone who was 65 or older. The average household size was 4.06.  There were 197 families (80.7% of households); the average family size was 4.46.

The age distribution was 346 people (34.9%) under the age of 18, 114 people (11.5%) aged 18 to 24, 259 people (26.1%) aged 25 to 44, 209 people (21.1%) aged 45 to 64, and 63 people (6.4%) who were 65 or older.  The median age was 27.2 years. For every 100 females, there were 113.6 males.  For every 100 females age 18 and over, there were 116.4 males.

There were 274 housing units at an average density of 363.2 per square mile, of the occupied units 122 (50.0%) were owner-occupied and 122 (50.0%) were rented. The homeowner vacancy rate was 2.3%; the rental vacancy rate was 3.9%.  501 people (50.6% of the population) lived in owner-occupied housing units and 490 people (49.4%) lived in rental housing units.

References

Census-designated places in Kern County, California
Census-designated places in California